USS Bluebird or USS Blue Bird has been the name of more than one United States Navy ship, and may refer to:

 , a patrol vessel in commission from 1917 to 1919
 , a minesweeper in commission from 1940 to 1945
 , a submarine rescue ship in commission from 1946 to 1950
 , a minesweeper in commission from 1953 to 1968 and in non-commissioned service as a training ship from 1968 to 1971

United States Navy ship names